Ronald Prescott Loui is an American computer scientist, currently working as a professor of computer science at Case Western Reserve University. He is known for having supplied first-hand biographical information on Barack Obama about his time in Hawaii. Previously, he has been a professor at Washington University in St. Louis and University of Illinois Springfield.

Biography

Loui earned his Bachelor's degree from Harvard University in Applied Mathematics in 1982.

Loui earned his Ph.D. under Henry E. Kyburg, at the University of Rochester and completed a postdoc at Stanford between 1987 and 1988 under Patrick Suppes and Amos Tversky. From 1988 to 2008, he was an associate professor of Computer Science at Washington University in St. Louis in the School of Engineering, having been tenured in 1994. He was also associated with multiple departments outside of Engineering, as well as several research centers. While at WashU, He organized the first Harvard internet alumni club and built a citation-based search engine for legal opinions in the early 1990s. He left academia for a few years to join industry. Between 2012 and 2015, he was an assistant professor at University of Illinois Springfield.

Loui is a leading advocate of defeasible reasoning in artificial intelligence and a leading proponent of scripting languages. He is co-patent holder of a deep packet inspection hardware device that could read and edit the contents of packets as they stream through a network. This was a key technology sought by the DARPA Information Awareness Office and Disruptive Technology Office under Total Information Awareness.  Loui also consulted for Cyc, a famous Artificial Intelligence program created by Doug Lenat.

Loui supervised students in a National Science Foundation Research Experiences for Undergraduates program that produced several current professors of computing, and the author of the original Google search engine.

References

External links
 Prof. Loui's old academic web site
 List of Prof. Loui's papers and citations
 Some of Prof. Loui's awk programs at awk.info
 A comic book character based on Professor Loui, in an Obama biography by J. Mariotte

1961 births
Living people
Punahou School alumni
People from Honolulu
Washington University in St. Louis faculty
University of Illinois at Springfield faculty
Google people
Case Western Reserve University faculty
Harvard College alumni
University of Rochester alumni